Hoesdorf is a village in the commune of Reisdorf, in eastern Luxembourg.  , the village has a population of 141.

Weblinks 
 Photos of the Nikolaskapelle on the European Round Tower Churches Website

References 

Diekirch (canton)
Villages in Luxembourg